Lissemys ceylonensis, the Sri Lankan flapshell turtle, is a freshwater species of turtle endemic to Sri Lanka.

References

External links

Lissemys
Reptiles of Sri Lanka
Reptiles described in 1856
Taxa named by John Edward Gray